Tachileik District (Thai meaning: "Cassod Port") is a district of the Shan State in Myanmar. It consists of one town and 295 villages. It is one of the four districts of Eastern Shan State.

The main town of Tachileik borders with the northernmost town  of Mai Sae in the Chang Rai province of Thailand. Tachileik and Mai Sae have immigration processing and border crossing checkpoints at both ends of the bridge that connects the two border towns.

Townships

The district contains the following townships:
Tachileik Township
Mong Hpayak Township (formerly part of Mong Hpayak District)
Mong Yawng Township (formerly part of Mong Hpayak District)

References

Districts of Myanmar
Geography of Shan State